Nutrient pollution, a form of water pollution, refers to contamination by excessive inputs of nutrients. It is a primary cause of eutrophication of surface waters (lakes, rivers and coastal waters), in which excess nutrients, usually nitrogen or phosphorus, stimulate algal growth. Sources of nutrient pollution include surface runoff from farm fields and pastures, discharges from septic tanks and feedlots, and emissions from combustion. Raw sewage is a large contributor to cultural eutrophication since sewage is high in nutrients. Releasing raw sewage into a large water body is referred to as sewage dumping, and still occurs all over the world. Excess reactive nitrogen compounds in the environment are associated with many large-scale environmental concerns. These include eutrophication of surface waters, harmful algal blooms, hypoxia, acid rain, nitrogen saturation in forests, and climate change.

Since the agricultural boom in the 1910s and again in the 1940s to match the increase in food demand, agricultural production relies heavily on the use of fertilizers. Fertilizer is a natural or chemically modified substance that helps soil become more fertile. These fertilizers contain high amounts of phosphorus and nitrogen, which results in excess amounts of nutrients entering the soil.  Nitrogen, phosphorus and potassium are the "Big 3" primary nutrients in commercial fertilizers, each of these fundamental nutrients play a key role in plant nutrition. When nitrogen and phosphorus are not fully utilized by the growing plants, they can be lost from the farm fields and negatively impact air and downstream water quality. These nutrients can eventually end up in aquatic ecosystems and are a contributor to increased eutrophication. When farmers spread their fertilizer, whether it is organic or synthetically made, some of it will leave as runoff and can collect downstream generating cultural eutrophication.

Mitigation approaches to reduce nutrient pollutant discharges include nutrient remediation, nutrient trading and nutrient source apportionment.

Sources 

The principal source(s) of nutrient pollution in an individual watershed depend on the prevailing land uses. The sources may be point sources, nonpoint sources, or both:
 Agriculture: animal production or crops
 Urban/suburban: stormwater runoff from roads and parking lots; excessive fertilizer use on lawns; municipal sewage treatment plants; motor vehicle emissions
 Industrial: air pollution emissions (e.g. electric power plants), wastewater discharges from various industries.
Nutrient pollution from some air pollution sources may occur independently of the local land uses, due to long-range transport of air pollutants from distant sources.

In order to gauge how to best prevent eutrophication from occurring, specific sources that contribute to nutrient loading must be identified. There are two common sources of nutrients and organic matter: point and nonpoint sources.

Nitrogen
Use of synthetic fertilizers, burning of fossil fuels, and agricultural animal production, especially concentrated animal feeding operations (CAFO), have added large quantities of reactive nitrogen to the biosphere. Globally, nitrogen balances are quite inefficiently distributed with some countries having surpluses and others deficits, causing especially a range of environmental issues in the former. For most countries around the world, the trade-off between closing yield gaps and mitigating nitrogen pollution is small or non-existent.

Phosphorus
Phosphorus pollution is caused by excessive use of fertilizers and manure, particularly when compounded by soil erosion. In the European Union, it is estimated that we may lose more than 100,000 tonnes of Phosphorus to water bodies and lakes due to water erosion. Phosphorus is also discharged by municipal sewage treatment plants and some industries.

Point sources
Point sources are directly attributable to one influence. In point sources the nutrient waste travels directly from source to water. Point sources are relatively easy to regulate.

Nonpoint sources
Nonpoint source pollution (also known as 'diffuse' or 'runoff' pollution) is that which comes from ill-defined and diffuse sources. Nonpoint sources are difficult to regulate and usually vary spatially and temporally (with season, precipitation, and other irregular events).

It has been shown that nitrogen transport is correlated with various indices of human activity in watersheds, including the amount of development. Ploughing in agriculture and development are among activities that contribute most to nutrient loading.

Soil retention
Nutrients from human activities tend to accumulate in soils and remain there for years. It has been shown that the amount of phosphorus lost to surface waters increases linearly with the amount of phosphorus in the soil. Thus much of the nutrient loading in soil eventually makes its way to water. Nitrogen, similarly, has a turnover time of decades.

Runoff to surface water
Nutrients from human activities tend to travel from land to either surface or ground water. Nitrogen in particular is removed through storm drains, sewage pipes, and other forms of surface runoff.
Nutrient losses in runoff and leachate are often associated with agriculture. Modern agriculture often involves the application of nutrients onto fields in order to maximize production. However, farmers frequently apply more nutrients than are needed by crops, resulting in the excess pollution running off into either surface or groundwater. or pastures. Regulations aimed at minimizing nutrient exports from agriculture are typically far less stringent than those placed on sewage treatment plants and other point source polluters. It should be also noted that lakes within forested land are also under surface runoff influences. Runoff can wash out the mineral nitrogen and phosphorus from detritus and in consequence supply the water bodies leading to slow, natural eutrophication.

Atmospheric deposition
Nitrogen is released into the air because of ammonia volatilization and nitrous oxide production. The combustion of fossil fuels is a large human-initiated contributor to atmospheric nitrogen pollution. Atmospheric nitrogen reaches the ground by two different processes, the first being wet deposition such as rain or snow, and the second being dry deposition which is particles and gases found in the air. Atmospheric deposition (e.g., in the form of acid rain) can also affect nutrient concentration in water, especially in highly industrialized regions.

Impacts

Environmental and economic impacts 

Excess nutrients have been summarized as potentially leading to:
 Excess growth of algae (harmful algal blooms); and biodiversity loss;
 Species composition shifts (dominant taxa);
 Food web changes, light limitation;
 Excess organic carbon (eutrophication); dissolved oxygen deficits (environmental hypoxia); toxin production;

Nutrient pollution can have economic impacts due to increasing water treatment costs, commercial fishing and shellfish losses, recreational fishing losses, and reduced tourism income.

Health impacts 
Human health effects include excess nitrate in drinking water (blue baby syndrome) and disinfection by-products in drinking water. Swimming in water affected by a harmful algal bloom can cause skin rashes and respiratory problems.

Reduction of nutrient pollutant discharges

Nutrient trading
Nutrient trading is a type of water quality trading, a market-based policy instrument used to improve or maintain water quality. The concept of water quality trading is based on the fact that different pollution sources in a watershed can face very different costs to control the same pollutant. Water quality trading involves the voluntary exchange of pollution reduction credits from sources with low costs of pollution control to those with high costs of pollution control, and the same principles apply to nutrient water quality trading. The underlying principle is "polluter pays", usually linked with a regulatory requirement for participating in the trading program.
 
A 2013 Forest Trends report summarized water quality trading programs and found three main types of funders: beneficiaries of watershed protection, polluters compensating for their impacts and "public good payers" that may not directly benefit, but fund the pollution reduction credits on behalf of a government or NGO. As of 2013, payments were overwhelmingly initiated by public good payers like governments and NGOs.

Nutrient source apportionment 
Nutrient source apportionment is used to estimate the nutrient load from various sectors entering water bodies, following attenuation or treatment. Agriculture is typically the principal source of nitrogen in water bodies in Europe, whereas in many countries households and industries tend to be the dominant contributors of phosphorus. Where water quality is impacted by excess nutrients, load source apportionment models can support the proportional and pragmatic management of water resources by identifying the pollution sources. There are two broad approaches to load apportionment modelling, (i) load-orientated approaches which apportion origin based on in-stream monitoring data and (ii) source-orientated approaches where amounts of diffuse, or nonpoint source pollution, emissions are calculated using models typically based on export coefficients from catchments with similar characteristics. For example, the Source Load Apportionment Model (SLAM) takes the latter approach, estimating the relative contribution of sources of nitrogen and phosphorus to surface waters in Irish catchments without in-stream monitoring data by integrating information on point discharges (urban wastewater, industry and septic tank systems), diffuse sources (pasture, arable, forestry, etc.), and catchment data, including hydrogeological characteristics.

Country examples

United States 
Agricultural nonpoint source (NPS) pollution is the largest source of water quality impairments throughout the U.S., based on surveys by state environmental agencies. NPS pollution is not subject to discharge permits under the federal Clean Water Act (CWA). EPA and states have used grants, partnerships and demonstration projects to create incentives for farmers to adjust their practices and reduce surface runoff.

Development of nutrient policy
The basic requirements for states to develop nutrient criteria and standards were mandated in the 1972 Clean Water Act. Implementing this water quality program has been a major scientific, technical and resource-intensive challenge for both EPA and the states, and development is continuing well into the 21st century.

EPA published a wastewater management regulation in 1978 to begin to address the national nitrogen pollution problem, which had been increasing for decades. In 1998, the agency published a National Nutrient Strategy with a focus on developing nutrient criteria.

Between 2000 and 2010 EPA published federal-level nutrient criteria for rivers/streams, lakes/reservoirs, estuaries and wetlands; and related guidance. "Ecoregional" nutrient criteria for 14 ecoregions across the U.S. were included in these publications. While states may directly adopt the EPA-published criteria, in many cases the states need to modify the criteria to reflect site-specific conditions. In 2004, EPA stated its expectations for numeric criteria (as opposed to less-specific narrative criteria) for total nitrogen (TN), total phosphorus (TP), chlorophyll a(chl-a), and clarity, and established "mutually-agreed upon plans" for state criteria development. In 2007, the agency stated that progress among the states on developing nutrient criteria had been uneven. EPA reiterated its expectations for numeric criteria and promised its support for state efforts to develop their own criteria.

After the EPA had introduced watershed-based NPDES permitting in 2007, interest in nutrient removal and achieving regional 
Total Maximum Daily Load (TMDL) limitations led to the development of nutrient trading schemes.

In 2008 EPA published a progress report on state efforts to develop nutrient standards. A majority of states had not developed numeric nutrient criteria for rivers and streams; lakes and reservoirs; wetlands and estuaries (for those states that have estuaries). In the same year, EPA also established a Nutrient Innovations Task Group (NITG), composed of state and EPA experts, to monitor and evaluate the progress of reducing nutrient pollution. In 2009 the NTIG issued a report, "An Urgent Call to Action," expressing concern that water quality continued to deteriorate nationwide due to increasing nutrient pollution, and recommending more vigorous development of nutrient standards by the states.

In 2011 EPA reiterated the need for states to fully develop their nutrient standards, noting that drinking water violations for nitrates had doubled in eight years, that half of all streams nationwide had medium to high levels of nitrogen and phosphorus, and harmful algal blooms were increasing. The agency set out a framework for states to develop priorities and watershed-level goals for reductions of nutrients.

Discharge permits
Many point source dischargers in the U.S., while not necessarily the largest sources of nutrients in their respective watersheds, are required to comply with nutrient effluent limitations in their permits, which are issued through the National Pollutant Discharge Elimination System (NPDES), pursuant to the CWA. Some large municipal sewage treatment plants, such as the Blue Plains Advanced Wastewater Treatment Plant in Washington, D.C. have installed biological nutrient removal (BNR) systems to comply with regulatory requirements. Other municipalities have made adjustments to the operational practices of their existing secondary treatment systems to control nutrients.

Discharges from large livestock facilities (CAFO) are also regulated by NPDES permits. Surface runoff from farm fields, the principal source of nutrients in many watersheds, is classified as NPS pollution and is not regulated by NPDES permits.

TMDL program
A Total Maximum Daily Load (TMDL) is a regulatory plan that prescribes the maximum amount of a pollutant (including nutrients) that a body of water can receive while still meeting CWA water quality standards. Specifically, Section 303 of the Act requires each state to generate a TMDL report for each body of water impaired by pollutants. TMDL reports identify pollutant levels and strategies to accomplish pollutant reduction goals. EPA has described TMDLs as establishing a "pollutant budget" with allocations to each of the pollutant's sources. For many coastal water bodies, the main pollutant issue is excess nutrients, also termed nutrient over-enrichment.

A TMDL can prescribe the minimum level of dissolved oxygen (DO) available in a body of water, which is directly related to nutrient levels. (See Aquatic Hypoxia.) TMDLs addressing nutrient pollution are a major component of the U.S. National Nutrient Strategy. TMDLs identify all point source and nonpoint source pollutants within a watershed. To implement TMDLs with point sources, wasteload allocations are incorporated into their NPDES permits. NPS discharges are generally in a voluntary compliance scenario.

This regulatory plan covers both the estuary and its tributaries—the largest, most complex TMDL document that EPA had issued to date.

In Long Island Sound, the TMDL development process enabled the Connecticut Department of Energy and Environmental Protection and the New York State Department of Environmental Conservation to incorporate a 58.5 percent nitrogen reduction target into a regulatory and legal framework.

See also
 Agricultural wastewater treatment

References

 
 EPA. "Protecting Water Quality from Agricultural Runoff." March 2005. Document No. EPA 841-F-05-001. Fact sheet.

Agricultural soil science
Environmental soil science
Fertilizers
Organic gardening
Sustainable agriculture
Water pollution
Nutrient pollution